Dan Patterson (born March 1960) is a British television producer and writer, responsible for the production of both the British and American incarnations of the improvisation show Whose Line Is It Anyway? and the British satirical panel show Mock the Week with writing partner Mark Leveson. He has also written for episodes of both shows.

He co-created Whose Line Is It Anyway? alongside Mark Leveson, initially on BBC radio before moving with it to Channel 4, and then onward to ABC. In 2004, he established Angst Productions, which is responsible for Mock the Week.

In October 2013, the play The Duck House, a farcical political satire which he wrote alongside Have I Got News for You writer Colin Swash, embarked on a five-week tour before transferring to the Vaudeville Theatre in London's West End through Spring 2014.

Television
Producer
 Clive Anderson Talks Back - Channel 4
 Clive Anderson All Talk - BBC One
 S and M - Channel 4
 The Brain Drain - BBC Two
 Never Mind the Horrocks - Channel 4
 The Peter Principle - BBC One
 Room 101 - BBC Two
 Whose Line Is It Anyway? - Channel 4 (UK version) as producer and ABC/The CW (US version) as executive producer.
 Mock the Week - BBC Two
 Kelsey Grammer American Sketch Show - Fox
 Fast and Loose - BBC Two

Stage
Writer
 The Duck House

References

External links

British television producers
Living people
Date of birth missing (living people)
Place of birth missing (living people)
1960 births